Morley James Kilburn (November 22, 1922 – February 23, 2008) was a Canadian ice hockey player with the Edmonton Mercurys. He won a gold medal at the 1950 World Ice Hockey Championships in London, England. The 1950 Edmonton Mercurys team was inducted to the Alberta Sports Hall of Fame in 2011.

References

1922 births
2008 deaths
Canadian ice hockey defencemen
Ice hockey people from Saskatchewan
People from Rural Municipality Buffalo No. 409, Saskatchewan